Tinsley Park Cemetery is one of the city of Sheffield's many cemeteries. The cemetery is still open to burials, and since the first burial on 2 June 1882 over 59,000 burials have taken place. There are buried in the cemetery 42 Commonwealth service personnel from World War I and 32 from World War II.

The entranceway to the cemetery is flanked by a pair of Grade II listed Gothic style chapels, where services can be held prior to the burial. Other listed structures in the cemetery include the lodge, gateway and boundary wall and a war memorial, 250m east of the chapel.

References

External links
 Sheffield Bereavement & Cemeteries
 

Tinsley
Anglican cemeteries in the United Kingdom
Grade II listed buildings in Sheffield
Grade II listed churches in South Yorkshire